Gornja Podgorja is a settlement in the Municipality of Mrkonjic Grad of the Republika Srpska Entity in Bosnia and Herzegovina.

Name 
Gornja Podgorja derives from the combined words of Pod (under) and Gora (hill or mountain) translating to a settlement under a mountain.

Demographics 
According to the 1991 census, the village had a total of 106 inhabitants. Ethnic groups in the village include:

 Serbs: 106 (100%)

According to the 2013 census, the village had a total of 46 inhabitants. Ethnic groups in the village include:

 Serbs 46 (100%)

References

Notes

Bibliography 

Populated places in Republika Srpska